Virginia Peak is a mountain summit in the northern part of Yosemite National Park, north of Tuolumne Meadows. It is the 25th-highest mountain in Yosemite National Park.

Virginia Peak's particulars

Virginia Peak is in northeastern Yosemite National Park, on a north–south ridge splitting off the main Sierra crest at Twin Peaks.

Virginia Pass and Sawtooth Ridge are near, as are Whorl Mountain, Excelsior Mountain and Matterhorn Peak.

Near Virginia Pass, viewed from the east, Virginia Peak looks dark, forbidding — it is not composed of more-common Yosemite granite, but of reddish metamorphic rock, such as is found on Mount Dana and Dunderberg Peak. Of note, Virginia Peak is along the ancient boundary between the Sierra Nevada Batholith's intruding granite  and pre-existing sediments, which are now metamorphosed, so-called metasediments.

Climate
Virginia Peak is located in an alpine climate zone. Most weather fronts originate in the Pacific Ocean, and travel east toward the Sierra Nevada mountains. As fronts approach, they are forced upward by the peaks (orographic lift), causing moisture in the form of rain or snowfall to drop onto the range.

See also
 
 Geology of the Yosemite area

References

External links
 A topographic map of the area

Mountains of Yosemite National Park
Mountains of Tuolumne County, California
Mountains of Northern California
Sierra Nevada (United States)
North American 3000 m summits